The Centre for Cities is an independent, non-partisan urban policy research unit and a charity registered in England. The Centre's main goal is to understand how and why economic growth and change takes place in the United Kingdom's cities.

History
The Centre for Cities was launched in March 2005 as part of IPPR and became independent in November 2007.

Research
The Centre produces an annual Cities Outlook report assessing the economic performance of the 64 largest towns and cities in the United Kingdom. From 2016 onwards the Centre for Cities reevaluated its methodology for defining primary urban areas, based on this it now recognises 63 primary urban areas in the UK:
 Grimsby and Hastings removed
 Basildon, Exeter and Slough added
 Bolton and Rochdale merged with the Manchester PUA.

In 2018, the Centre for Cities released a report challenging the Government's approach to improving UK business productivity. They suggest that the Government should focus on the UK's weaker regions to attract more productive exporters, and not just focus on the UK's least productive companies in general.

Funding 
In November 2022, the funding transparency website Who Funds You? gave Centre for Cities a B grade (rating goes from A to E).

References

External links
 Centre for Cities

National institutes of urbanism
Urban planning organizations
Charities based in London